Juan Martin Flavier (June 23, 1935 – October 30, 2014) was a Filipino physician and politician. He served as the Secretary of Health under President Fidel V. Ramos from 1992 to 1995, and was later elected to the Senate, serving from 1995 to 2007.

Early life
Flavier was born in Tondo, Manila. He was born in a very poor family to semi-literate parents.  He eventually moved to Baguio where he finished his secondary studies at the Baguio City National High School. He is trained as a doctor and received his Doctor of Medicine degree from the UP College of Medicine at the University of the Philippines Manila in 1960 and Masters in Public Health from the Bloomberg School of Public Health at Johns Hopkins University in 1969.

He was known for his short stature at only 1.50 meters (4 ft 11 in).

Career

"Doctor to the Barrios" 
Flavier went to serve poor rural barangays in Nueva Ecija and Cavite as a "doctor to the barrios". He was a "country doctor" for 30 years. His work was recognized and he was appointed president of the Philippine Rural Reconstruction Movement. in 1967. From 1978 to 1992, he was president of the International Institute of Rural Reconstruction.

Department of Health 
In 1992, Philippine President Fidel Ramos appointed Flavier Secretary of the Department of Health. During his term, he initiated various health programs such as Oplan Alís Disease, Kontra Kolera, Stop TB, Araw ng Sangkáp Pinoy, Family Planning and Doctor to the Barrios Program. During his term barangay health workers were organized. He served as Secretary of the Department of Health until 1995. He was regularly rated one of the most popular government officials and his department one of the most effective.  He was perhaps the most popular Secretary of Health.

Philippine Senate 
In 1995, he ran for senator and won under the Ramos administration ticket and was re-elected to a second term in the 2001 elections, placing second among the 12 winning candidates. As senator, he authored and sponsored several landmark bills including the Traditional Medicine Law, the Social Reform and Poverty Alleviation Act, Philippine Clean Air Act, Indigenous People's Rights Act, Anti-money Laundering Act, Barangay Micro-Business Enterprise, National Service Training Program for Tertiary Students, Dangerous Drugs Act, Plant Variety Protection Act, Philippine Nursing Act, the Tobacco Regulation Act, and the law declaring Eid'l Fitr a national public holiday in the Philippines.

When he was senator he had a perfect attendance record during sessions, a fact mentioned in the Senate resolution marking his death, which read in part, "The hard-working legislator registered a perfect attendance during the sessions and was instrumental in the enactment of landmark legislations promoting public health care and improving the quality of life of the people."  He was also the "poorest" senator, with a net worth on his 2005 Statement of Assets, Liabilities and Net worth (SALN) of 3.49 million Philippine pesos.

Flavier was also formerly a resident presenter on Kapwa Ko Mahal Ko, a public service programme on GMA Network.

Death
Flavier died of pneumonia-related sepsis and organ failure at 16:00 PST (GMT+8) on October 30, 2014, at the age of 79. He was admitted to the intensive care unit of the National Kidney and Transplant Institute in Quezon City as early as September 11.

Works
Flavier wrote a regular newspaper column about his experiences as a doctor in the countryside, even while he served at Health Secretary.

Below is a listing of works authored by Flavier, including Doctor to the Barrios, wherein he narrates his experience working with and for the Philippine Rural Reconstruction Movement.

Books
Doctor to the Barrios, Experiences with the Philippine Rural Reconstruction Movement (1970)
My Friends in the Barrios (1974)
Back to the Barrios: Balikbaryo (1978)
Parables of the Barrio: Vol. I (1988)
Parables of the Barrio: Vol. II, Nos. 51-100 (1989)
Parables of the Barrio: Vol. III, Nos. 101-150 (1991)
Let's DOH It!: How We Did It (1998)
From Barrio to Senado: an Autobiography (2009)

Papers
''Mobilizing Local Leaders for Rural Development: The Case of the People's School (IIRR working paper, 1980)

References

1935 births
2014 deaths
Senators of the 13th Congress of the Philippines
Senators of the 12th Congress of the Philippines
Senators of the 11th Congress of the Philippines
Senators of the 10th Congress of the Philippines
Presidents pro tempore of the Senate of the Philippines
Secretaries of Health of the Philippines
Filipino public health doctors
Filipino non-fiction writers
Filipino medical writers
Health and wellness writers
Filipino general practitioners
Johns Hopkins Bloomberg School of Public Health alumni
Lakas–CMD (1991) politicians
Lakas–CMD politicians
People from Tondo, Manila
University of the Philippines Manila alumni
Ramos administration cabinet members
Filipino United Methodists